Calliphora uralensis is a species of fly from genus Calliphora,  family Calliphoridae, described by Villeneuve in 1922. According to the Catalogue of Life Calliphora uralensis doesn't have known subspecies.

References

Calliphoridae
Insects described in 1922